India Sweets and Spices is a 2021 American comedy-drama film directed and written by Geeta Malik. The film had a limited theatrical release in the United States on November 19, 2021.  The film stars Sophia Ali, Manisha Koirala, Rish Shah, and Adil Hussain. The film is based on Geeta Malik's own script “Dinner With Friends” that won the 2016 Academy Nicholl Fellowships in screen-writing.

Synopsis 

Alia Kapur comes home from California to her upper class neighborhood in suburban New Jersey for summer vacation. Back in her community of Indian-Americans, Alia deals with her family's drama while meeting Varun, an Indian-American man from a much poorer background than her own. They begin to see each other secretly, but it turns out that their mothers have a history Alia never knew about.

Cast 
Sophia Ali as Alia "Ali"  Kapur. She is a UCLA student who returns home to Ruby Hill, New Jersey.
Manisha Koirala as Sheila Kapur, Alia's strict mother
 Rish Shah as Varun Dutta. Alia falls in love with him after meeting him in a grocery store.
Adil Hussain as Ranjit Kapur, Alia's laidback father
Anita Kalathara as Neha, Alia's best friend
Deepti Gupta as Bhairavi Dutta, Varun's mother. She went to the same Delhi college as Sheila.
Moses Das as Nitin Varma, Best friends to Alia, Varun, Neha, and Rahul. 
Raj Kala as Gurvinder Dutta, Varun's father
Ved Sapru as Rahul Singh, Alia's friend

Production 
Malik drew upon her childhood experiences in Aurora, Colorado for the film. Her parents would take part in what Malik's mother described as 'Desi therapy' with others in their Indian community, where they would "eat their own food and have our own clothes on". Malik initially saw these parties as comforting but that "as I got older, I realized there was also a lot of backbiting and gossiping; there was a lot of drama behind the scenes."

India Sweets and Spices was filmed in Metro Atlanta.

Release 
India Sweets and Spices had its world premiere at the Tribeca Film Festival on June 12, 2021, followed by a screening at the San Diego Asian Film Festival on October 30 of the same year. The movie had a limited theatrical release in the United States starting on November 19, 2021.

Reception 
India Sweets and Spices has a rating of 83% on Rotten Tomatoes, based on 23 reviews. Lisa Kennedy of The New York Times wrote that "Without sacrificing comedic buoyancy, Malik and her ensemble make palpable a community that is vibrant and claustrophobic".  Kristen Page-Kirby of The Washington Post said that "But Malik has created a world that feels very real, ably communicating its occasionally frustrating and deceptively complex contours". Kimber Myers of Los Angeles Times wrote that "Warmth and intelligence — and a strong sense of both fun and feminism — make Malik’s film worth a watch, and rising star Ali is worth keeping an eye on as well".

Roxana Hadadi of RogerEbert.com rated the film at two stars, noting that the movie followed a formula typical of "Movies about “ethnic” communities" while also stating that "Koirala and Gupta! "India Sweets and Spices" is worth watching for their work alone." Josh Kupecki of The Austin Chronicle gave the film the same rating and opined that "Positive ethnic portrayals are always refreshing, but unfortunately, homogenization rarely has any flavor".

References

External links 
 
 

Bleecker Street films
Films set in New Jersey
Films shot in Atlanta
Desi films
2020s English-language films